Mary Lou Sumner (née Fehr) (May 5, 1927 – July 27, 2002) was an American politician.

Born in Eureka, Woodford County, Illinois, Sumner went to Woodruff High School, in Peoria, Illinois. She also went to Bradley University for two years. Sumner also served on the local selective service board. Sumner founded Mary Lou Records. She lived in Dunlap, Illinois. From 1977 to 1981, Sumner served in the Illinois House of Representatives and was involved with the Republican Party. She was defeated by Don Saltsman in 1980. Sumner died in Mountain View, Arkansas.

Notes

External links

1927 births
2002 deaths
People from Eureka, Illinois
Bradley University alumni
Businesspeople from Illinois
Women state legislators in Illinois
Republican Party members of the Illinois House of Representatives
20th-century American women politicians
20th-century American politicians
People from Peoria County, Illinois
20th-century American businesspeople